James Cato "Bad News" Galloway (September 16, 1887 – May 3, 1950) was an American Major League Baseball second baseman who played for the St. Louis Cardinals in 1912.

Galloway began his professional career in 1910 and played until 1917. He served in World War I, then returned to professional baseball in 1920, playing until 1929, when he was 41 years old.

He made his major league debut on August 24, 1912 and played his final game on October 1 of that year. In 21 games, the 24-year-old hit .185 with no home runs, four RBI, two doubles and two stolen bases in 54 at-bats.

In the minor leagues, he played in 2,117 games and hit around .298 with at least 2,265 hits and 159 home runs. He hit over .300 nine times, with a career high of .347 (which he accomplished twice). He managed in the minor leagues for a decade and umpired in the Texas League for three years.

References

External links

1887 births
1950 deaths
St. Louis Cardinals players
Baseball players from Texas
Minor league baseball managers
Shreveport Pirates (baseball) players
Vicksburg Hill Billies players
Austin Senators players
Indianapolis Indians players
Denver Bears players
Los Angeles Angels (minor league) players
Vernon Tigers players
Ranger Nitros players
Dallas Submarines players
Dallas Steers players
San Antonio Bears players
Waco Cubs players
Beaumont Exporters players
Wichita Falls Spudders players